Malin Head is the most northerly point of mainland Ireland, located in the townland of Ardmalin on the Inishowen peninsula in County Donegal. The head's northernmost point is called Dunalderagh at latitude 55.38ºN. Malin Head gives its name to the Malin sea area. There is a weather station on the head, which is one of 22 such stations whose reports are broadcast as part of the BBC Shipping Forecast. A tower built in 1805 is on Altnadarrow, also known locally as the Tower Hill.

Ptolemy's Geography (2nd century AD) described a point called Βορειον (Boreion, "the northern") which probably referred to Malin Head.

Locality
To the northeast Inistrahull Island can be seen. The first lighthouse on the island was put into operation in 1813, and the light flashes every 30 seconds.

Below Altnadarrow to the east lies Ballyhillion beach, a unique raised beach system of international scientific importance. The very distinct shorelines show the changing relationship between the sea and the land from the time the glaciers began to melt, some 15,000 years ago. At that time County Donegal was depressed by the weight of an immense ice sheet, so the level of the sea, relative to today's shore, was up to 80 feet higher than today.

Scenes from Star Wars: The Last Jedi were filmed in Malin Head.

Weather station
Weather reports commenced in Malin Head in 1885. In 1955 a new Meteorological station was built beside the coastguard station by Met Éireann. Hourly data points, which include sunshine, wind, rain etc, are recorded here.

Climate
Malin Head has a temperate oceanic climate (Köppen class Cfb). 
As a result of its exposed coastal location, high winds and storms are a notable presence for much of the year. Summers are typically mild bordering on cool, while winters have cool days and crisp nights.

Wartime use

A military watchtower was built on Altnadarrow in 1805, during the Napoleonic Wars. Around 1902, a signal station used by the Marconi Company was built close to the old Napoleonic watchtower. Both of these buildings still stand. 
 
During The Emergency (World War II), the Government of Ireland allowed the British Government to site two radio direction finders on Malin Head. This top-secret operation was mentioned in The Cranborne Report. The RDF equipment was used by Allied naval and air forces to monitor U-boat and aerial activity in the North Atlantic. A detailed history of radio at Malin Head, Marconi Wireless Radio Station: Malin Head from 1902 was published in 2014.

To the north of Altnadarrow and just before Dúnalderagh, a ground marker reading '80 EIRE' can be seen in large letters that were formed from placing stones together to form the letters. This was to signify to overflying planes that they were crossing Irish territory and that Ireland was neutral.

Ornithology 
Malin Head is an ideal vantage point from which to view the autumnal movements of seabirds such as gannets, shearwaters, skuas, auks and others, on their southward migration flights. Rarities have included Black-browed Albatross, Feas Petrel and many other rare seabirds have been recorded here. This is also a good vantage point for viewing Basking sharks and the resident pod of Bottle-nosed Dolphins.

Gallery

See also
Malin to Mizen
Wild Atlantic Way

References

External links
 Historic mapping of the area (Ordnance Survey Ireland{ Choose "Base history and mapping" then "Historic 25-inch mapping 1888-1913" and enter 55.3719929, -7.3392604 to see the site of the watch tower.
Modern mapping of the tower site  (OpenStreetMap)
 Location of weather station (OpenStreetMap)

Meteorological stations
Headlands of County Donegal